The 2014–15 Cincinnati Bearcats men's basketball team represented the University of Cincinnati in the 2014–15 NCAA Division I men's basketball season. The Bearcats played home games on Ed Jucker Court at the Fifth Third Arena. The 2014–15 season was the second season the Bearcats participated in the American Athletic Conference, and were coached by Mick Cronin in his ninth season. Mick Cronin discovered he had an arterial dissection and sat out the rest of the season, last coaching December 17 against San Diego State, which would see Assistant Head Coach Larry Davis coach the rest of the season. They finished the season 23–11, 13–5 in AAC play to finish in a tie for third place. They lost in the quarterfinals of the American Athletic tournament to UConn. They received an at-large bid to the NCAA tournament where they defeated Purdue in the second round before losing in the third round to Kentucky.

Offseason

Departing players

Incoming Transfers

Recruiting class of 2014

Recruiting class of 2015

Roster

Nov 21, 2014 - Ge'Lawn Guyn injured his pinky in practice. Guyn would leave the team after the fall semester and graduate in the spring. He maintained one year of eligibility and later transferred to East Tennessee State.

Dec 13, 2014 - Jamaree Strickland elected to transfer after the fall semester. Strickland had been suspended from the team since November 26. Strickland eventually transferred to Arizona Western College.

Feb 19, 2015 - Following the Xavier game, Deshaun Morman was indefinitely suspended. Morman would eventually transfer to Towson after the conclusion of the season.

Depth chart

Source

Schedule

|-
!colspan=12 style=|Exhibition

|-
!colspan=12 style=|Regular Season

|-
!colspan=12 style=|AAC Tournament

|-
!colspan=12 style=| NCAA Tournament

|-

Awards and milestones

American Athletic Conference honors

All-AAC Second Team
Octavius Ellis

All-AAC Honorable Mention
Troy Caupain

All-AAC Rookie Team
Gary Clark

Player of the Week
Week 17: Farad Cobb

Rookie of the Week
Week 4: Gary Clark

Source

References

Cincinnati Bearcats men's basketball seasons
Cincinnati Bearcats
Cincinnati
Cincinnati Bearcats men's basketball
Cincinnati Bearcats men's basketball